WYLN-CD, virtual channel 35 (UHF digital channel 26), is a low-powered, Class A YTA TV-affiliated television station licensed to Hazleton, Pennsylvania, United States and serving the Scranton–Wilkes-Barre television market. The station is owned by Triple J Community Broadcasting, L.L.C. WYLN-CD's transmitter is located near Hazleton.

History
The station went on the air in 1989 as W35AT, and changed to the current WYLN-LP in 1996. A year prior, it became the first affiliate of The WB in the Scranton/Wilkes-Barre/Hazleton market that year, later losing the affiliation to WSWB-TV in 1998. Until 2015, the station was an America One affiliate. That same year, America One merged with Youtoo TV, with the merged network being called Youtoo America.

Programming
Since 1989, WYLN has produced a live, local news program, airing live at 5:30 p.m. with rebroadcasts at 6:30 p.m., 10 p.m., 11:30 p.m. and 8 a.m. the following day on weekdays. News coverage is based in Hazleton and surrounding areas. WYLN's newscasts center around local news and segments, such as "Community and You", "Trooper Talk Tuesday", and "Wellness Wednesday".

WYLN also airs local sporting events such as high school football, basketball, wrestling, swimming and baseball, college athletics, and Lehigh Valley Iron Pigs Baseball.

WYLN produces several local programs, such as Talkin' NEPA, an in-depth interview show; Warrior Summit Outdoors, starring Retired SSG Erik Olson and combat veterans from multiple conflicts, focus on healing the often invisible wounds of war through outdoor activities; and Off the Beaten Path, hosted by Jeff Bonomo, featuring the "interesting & unique people, places and things in Pennsylvania."

Translators

Works cited

External links
Official website

YLN-LP
Television channels and stations established in 1991
Low-power television stations in the United States
1991 establishments in Pennsylvania
YTA TV affiliates